Aircraft Industries, a.s., operating as Let, n.p., is a Czech (before December 1992 Czechoslovak) civil aircraft manufacturer. Its most successful design has been the L-410 Turbolet, of which more than 1300 units have been built. Its head office is in Kunovice, Zlín Region. Let was owned by the Russian company UGMK from 2008 to 2022, when it was acquired by Czech-based Omnipol Group.

The company operates the sixth largest Czech airport and a private secondary school.

History

Building of an aircraft factory in Kunovice started in 1936, as a part of the Škoda Works industrial concern. Before and during World War II the unfinished plant served only as a repair works. After the end of the war the factory was nationalized and in 1950–53 a new plant was built. In 1957–1967 it was named SPP (Strojírny první pětiletky – "Works of the First Five-year Plan"), and in 1967 it returned to the name LET. The works produced under licence were the Soviet trainers Yakovlev Yak-11 (under a designation C-11) and the Aero Ae 45 and Aero Ae 145 utility aircraft.

In 1957 the company began to develop the L-200 Morava light utility aircraft and four years later the Z-37 Cmelak agricultural aircraft, which were both a commercial success.

Over the years Let developed and produced gliders: Zlín 22, Z-124 Galánka, LF-109 Pionýr, and Z-425 Šohaj. However the most popular gliders produced by LET are the Blaníks: L-13 Blaník, L-23 Super Blaník and L-33 Solo.

During the 1960s Let's engineers developed a 19-seat commuter turboprop, the L-410 Turbolet, of which more than 1200 were produced. This popular aircraft went through a number of improvements and modernisations and the latest types, the L 410 UVP-E20 and L 420 are EASA and FAA certified respectively.

The largest Czech transport aircraft, the Let L-610, was produced in 1988 in prototype form and displayed at the Paris Airshow. Production was cancelled due to lack of funding. There were eight prototypes made in the factory.

The all-metal Blaník sailplane was produced in the largest quantities of any sailplane, with over 3,000 manufactured since the first rolled off the production line in 1958. In 2005 it was still in production as the L23 Super Blaník variant.

The company explored the possibility of a joint venture with Fairchild Aircraft in the 1990s, but eventually decided against it. However, it was later purchased by Ayres Corporation in 1998. In 2001, it merged with Morovan Aeroplanes. Following bankruptcy, it was purchased by Aircraft Industries in 2005.

The Ural Mining and Metallurgical Company (UGMK) purchased 51% of the company's shares was in 2008; UAC had shown interest in acquiring the control of the company as well. UGMK purchased the remaining shares in 2013.

In April 2022, Aircraft Industries was acquired by the Prague-based company, Omnipol Group.

Products

Powered aircraft

Gliders

See also
 Aero Vodochody
 Avia
 Beneš-Mráz
 Letov Kbely
 Zlin Aircraft

References

Notes

Bibliography

External links

 Company website
 Company website 

Aircraft manufacturers of the Czech Republic and Czechoslovakia
Czech brands
Vehicle manufacturing companies established in 1936
Ural Mining and Metallurgical Company
1936 establishments in Czechoslovakia